St. Thomas' Anglican Church  is an historic Carpenter Gothic style Anglican church edifice built by the Hudson's Bay Company in Moose Factory, Ontario, Canada.

History
Construction began in 1864 but was not completed until 1885. St. Thomas' origins date to the late 1840s when officials of the Hudson's Bay Company requested the bishop of the Anglican Diocese of Rupert's Land to send someone to continue the missionary work of the Rev. George Barnley, a Wesleyan minister who had been in Moose Factory from 1840 to 1848. The bishop sent an English schoolteacher, John Horden, who arrived on August 26, 1851, with his bride. Horden set about learning the local Cree language and translating portions of the Bible, the Book of Common Prayer and hymns into it. He also started a school and started holding services for what would become St. Thomas' Church.

Horden was ordained to the priesthood while serving in Moose Factory and in 1872 became the first bishop of the Anglican Diocese of Moosonee whose see was then in Moose Factory.

Current use
St. Thomas' Anglican Church is still an active parish in the Anglican Diocese of Moosonee. Services are conducted in the Cree language and in English. Since October 2006, the historic church has not been used for services and needs significant repairs. The congregation uses another building that was formerly a Catholic church. The Rev. John B. Edmonds retired as priest in August 2008.

References

External links

 St. Thomas' Anglican church
 Panoramio listing for St. Thomas' Anglican Church with coordinates
 Journals of the Rev. John B. Edmonds

Anglican church buildings in Ontario
19th-century Anglican church buildings in Canada
Carpenter Gothic church buildings in Ontario
Buildings and structures in Cochrane District